The Upper Angara (Verkhnyaya Angara; , Deede Angar) is a river in Buryatia, Siberia to the northeast of Lake Baikal. the third longest river in the Baikal basin.

The Baikal–Amur Mainline runs along the north side of the river northeast up its valley, crossing between Anamakit and Novy Uoyan and crossing the river a second time upstream before heading into the mountains.

Course
It its upper course the river flows in a WSW direction across mountainous terrain, with rapids and waterfalls. It enters then a floodplain and crosses the spurs of the Upper Angara and the Barguzin ranges. Near Yanchukan it flows through the Upper Angara tectonic basin. Finally it ends in Lake Baikal forming a delta in the shallow northern end of the lake, separated from the deep part by long sandy spits, including Yarki Island. The Upper Angara is navigable in its last stretch.

See also
List of rivers of Russia

References

External links
 .

Rivers of Buryatia
Stanovoy Highlands